Bostryx anomphalus is a species of  tropical air-breathing land snail, a pulmonate gastropod mollusk in the family Bulimulidae.

Distribution 
 Peru The northernmost limit of this species is Cajamarca Region.

Description 
This is a variable species in its colour pattern, some specimens being uniformly whitish, others with axial streaks of various shades of brown at irregular intervals. Several specimens show a faint pattern of two or three spiral bands on the last whorl, the broadest around the shell base and one or two above the periphery. The upper whorls are whitish, bluish or in some specimens roseate.

References
This article incorporates CC-BY-3.0 text from the reference 

Bulimulidae
Gastropods described in 1944